The  Masonic Building, located at 296 to 304 Walnut Street and 456 to 460 Newtonville Avenue in the village of Newtonville, in Newton, Massachusetts in the United States, is a historic building built in 1896 as a Masonic Lodge hall. It is a massive four-story redbrick Renaissance-style building with a turret on the corner and a steep slate pyramid roof. The upper floors are still used for meetings of Masonic lodges and appendant orders, while the lower floors are used for retail and office purposes. The building was approved for listing on the National Register of Historic Places in 1986, but due to owner objection it was not listed. However, it was included as a contributing property to the Newtonville Historic District when that district was expanded in 1990.

See also
 National Register of Historic Places listings in Newton, Massachusetts
 Masonic Building (disambiguation)

References

External links
4 lodges that meet in the building
 City of Newton brochure: Discover Historic Newtonville
 Palestine Chapter No. 114, Order of the Eastern Star website - has picture of building
 http://www.ci.newton.ma.us/assessors2003/InteractiveMap.asp?

National Register of Historic Places

Historic district contributing properties in Newton, Massachusetts
Masonic buildings completed in 1896
Clubhouses on the National Register of Historic Places in Massachusetts
Buildings and structures in Newton, Massachusetts
Masonic buildings in Massachusetts
Individually listed contributing properties to historic districts on the National Register in Massachusetts
National Register of Historic Places in Newton, Massachusetts
Hartwell and Richardson buildings